San Bartolomeo Apostolo is a Roman Catholic basilica church located in piazza Federico Torre, along corso Garibaldi, in Benevento, region of Campania, Italy.

History
A church of the same name is documented in Benevento since the 9th century, putatively holding the relics of the apostle. This prior church at the site was razed by an earthquake in 1688, and the present church was moved here and designed by either Filippo Raguzzini or Nicolò Coscia, and was reconsecrated by Pope Benedict XIII in 1729.

References

Roman Catholic churches in Benevento
Basilica churches in Campania
18th-century Roman Catholic church buildings in Italy
Roman Catholic churches completed in 1728